Sphecioses is a genus of moths belonging to the family Tineidae. It contains only one species, Sphecioses acignathus, which is found in Venezuela.

The case-bearing larva of this species is believed to feed primarily as a scavenger within the nests of certain social bees and wasps.

References

Tineidae
Monotypic moth genera
Moths of South America
Tineidae genera